"Set the Controls for the Heart of the Sun" is a song by the English rock band Pink Floyd, appearing on their second album, A Saucerful of Secrets (1968). It was written by Roger Waters, taking lyrics from a Chinese poetry book, and features a drum part by Nick Mason played with timpani mallets. It is the only song recorded by Pink Floyd to feature material from all five band members, as there are several different guitar parts recorded by both David Gilmour and Syd Barrett.

The song was regularly performed between 1967 and 1973 and can be heard on the live disc of the 1969 album Ummagumma and seen in the 1972 movie Pink Floyd: Live at Pompeii. Waters has also played the song on several solo tours, as has drummer Nick Mason.

Composition
The song was written by Roger Waters, who came up with a riff over which he could sing a melody within his vocal range. He borrowed the lyrics from a book of Chinese poetry from the Tang Dynasty (which was later identified as the book Poems of the late T'ang, translated by A.C. Graham). The title was derived from a quotation from William S. Burroughs. Among the borrowed lines from Chinese poetry (as translated by Graham) were those written by Li He, whose poem "Don't Go Out of the Door" contains the line "Witness the man who raved at the wall as he wrote his questions to Heaven" (公看呵壁書問天); Li Shangyin, whose poetry contained the lines "watch little by little the night turns around" (暫見夜闌干), "countless the twigs which tremble in dawn" (撼曉幾多枝) and "one inch of love is one inch of ashes" (一寸相思一寸灰); and Du Mu, whose poetry contained the line "Lotuses lean on each other in yearning" (多少綠荷相倚恨).

The song's recording commenced on 8 August 1967 at Abbey Road Studios, with overdubs continuing through to January and February 1968. According to guitarist David Gilmour, the studio version of the song contained minor guitar work both from him and Syd Barrett, making "Set the Controls for the Heart of the Sun" the only Pink Floyd song that features all five band members. Keyboardist Richard Wright made prominent use of the Farfisa organ, and also played vibraphone and celesta on the track. Drummer Nick Mason enjoyed recording the track as it allowed him to emulate Chico Hamilton's drumming on "Blue Sands", using mallets, as seen in the 1958 film Jazz on a Summer's Day.

Release
The track was planned for release as a single, with "Scream Thy Last Scream", on 8 September, before this was vetoed by the band's record company, EMI. It is one of two songs from A Saucerful of Secrets which appear on the 2001 compilation album Echoes: The Best of Pink Floyd (the other being "Jugband Blues").

Reception
In a negative review of A Saucerful of Secrets, Jim Miller of Rolling Stone described "Set the Controls for the Heart of the Sun", along with "Let There Be More Light", as "boring melodically, harmonically, and lyrically." Miller further described the production work as "not as glittery as the first album's, and the instrumental work is shoddy and routine. Miller also described the track as too long.

Live performances
Pink Floyd performed the song from 1967 to 1973. A performance on 9 September 1967 featured Barrett and Waters switching guitars. The group's performance of the song on 27 April 1969 at Mother's, Birmingham and on 2 May 1969 at the Manchester College of Commerce was used for the live half of the double album Ummagumma. On 27 February 1971, a live performance of "Set the Controls" was filmed for ORTF, while a performance in Studio Europanisor, Paris, was filmed for Live at Pompeii. During these performances, the song was significantly extended with a range of dynamics, including a free-form middle section. The last documented performance by the group was on 13 October 1973 at the Wiener Stadthalle, Vienna.

The song has been a staple of Waters' solo tours. It was the opening song on 1984–1985 tours promoting The Pros and Cons of Hitch Hiking in a radically rearranged form, with female backing vocals, saxophone solos and a guitar solo (and even a shakuhachi solo in 1985). A truncated version (just the three verses) of the song, featuring a simple acoustic guitar part, was performed at a handful of the Radio K.A.O.S shows in 1987. The song was included in the setlist for his 1999–2002 In the Flesh tour, with stills from the promotional videos of "Arnold Layne" and "The Scarecrow" projected on large screens. This version – featuring a psychedelic guitar solo by Snowy White, and a sax solo – appears on Waters' 2000 In the Flesh – Live DVD and live album. In June 2002, Waters' former Pink Floyd bandmate Nick Mason performed as guest drummer on the track for two nights at London's Wembley Arena, the first indication of a reconciliation following the acrimonious split of the mid-1980s. It was also performed at Waters' 2006–2008 tour.

In 2016, Waters included the song in his concerts at the Zocalo Square and Foro Sol in Mexico, and the Desert Trip festival in the United States, but it was dropped from the setlist of his 2017 Us + Them Tour.

The song was played by Nick Mason's Saucerful of Secrets in 2018, 2019 and 2022. For the 18 April 2019 show in New York City, Waters performed lead vocals. "I really like playing 'Set the Controls'…'" Mason noted, "which is an unusual drum part, played with mallets rather than sticks."

Popular culture 
The song gave Douglas Adams the idea for a rock band called Disaster Area who featured in his book The Restaurant At The End Of The Universe. The band planned to crash a space ship into a nearby star as a stunt during a concert.

A rock climb at Twll Mawr, in Gwynedd, North Wales has been named after song.

The LCD Soundsystem song All My Friends includes the lyric "We set controls for the heart of the sun, one of the ways we show our age"

Personnel
Roger Waters – vocals, bass guitar, gong
Richard Wright – Farfisa organ, vibraphone, celesta
Nick Mason – drums (played with timpani mallets)
Syd Barrett – electric guitar
David Gilmour – electric guitar

Cover versions

 1989: Red Temple Spirits covered the song on their album If Tomorrow I Were Leaving for Lhasa, I Wouldn't Stay a Minute More....
 1990: The debut album by Bassomatic, Set the Controls for the Heart of the Bass, contained a likewise titled track, as written by Waters, Laurie Mayer and William Orbit.
 1994: Finnish ambient techno band Nemesis included a version as the closing track of their debut album Xcelsior.
 1994: On Erasure's single "Run to the Sun", a remix by Chris and Cosey was titled the "Set the Controls for the Heart of the Sun Mix".
 1995: Sludge metal band Nightstick covered the song on their album Blotter.
 1996: Experimental group Psychic TV recorded a cover of the song for their album Trip/Reset.
 2003: A cover version was done by prog metal supergroup OSI, included on the bonus disc of their debut album OSI.
 2003: Drone/sludge metal band 5ive recorded the track "The Hemophiliac Dream, Pt. 1" for an EP of the same name. It served as a tribute to "Set the Controls...": Its tonal progression was similar to its parent song, the lyric "Set the controls" appeared once early in the song, and a chant of "The heart of the sun" served as a quasi-chorus.
 2007: German gothic rock band the House of Usher recorded a version as the title theme for the audiobook edition of Stephen Baxter's science fiction novel Titan.
 2008: The Smashing Pumpkins played a 20-minute live version of the song on the final leg of their 2008 tour.
 2008: Finnish experimental electronic artist Mika Vainio released a cover version titled "Set the Controls to the Heart of the Sun" on his album Oleva.
 2009: Norwegian black metal band 1349 recorded a cover version which appeared on their album Revelations of the Black Flame.
 2009: Brazilian psychedelic rock band Violeta de Outono covered the song on their live video Seventh Brings Return: A Tribute to Syd Barrett, originally recorded in 2006.
 2010: German psychedelic rock band Vibravoid covered the song on their EP What Color is Pink? (6:26). In 2011 they released an extended version (22:46) on their album Minddrugs.
 2013: A piano version was performed by Ayşedeniz Gökçin on her self-released 2013 album Pink Floyd Classical Concepts. 
 2016: German atmospheric black metal band the Ruins of Beverast covered and extended the song to 11:48 for their EP Takitum Tootem!.
 2021: German dark wave band Deine Lakaien covered the song on their album Dual +. 
 Sludge metal band Kylesa have performed a version of the song in their live set.
 A version of the song was done by Israeli doom/death band Salem.

Cultural references
 The album The Dark Side of the Moog IX (2002) by Klaus Schulze and Pete Namlook is subtitled "Set the Controls for the Heart of the Mother". Their later album The Dark Side of the Moog XI (2008) is subtitled "The Heart of Our Nearest Star".

References
Citations

Sources

External links

 

1968 songs
Pink Floyd songs
Experimental rock songs
Songs written by Roger Waters

he:Set The Controls For The Heart Of The Sun